Tove was a sculptor and stonemason active in Scania during the Middle Ages. The artist made and signed the baptismal font of Gumlösa Church with the words Tove gierhi ("Tove made me"). Gumlösa Church was inaugurated in 1191. Tove also made the baptismal font in Lyngsjö Church and perhaps Östra Sönnarslöv and Bjäresjö Church, also in Scania.

References

External link
 Frans Carlsson, "Lyngsjömästaren : en tysk stenhuggare i Skåne omkring 1200", Fornvännen, 1970, p. 318-327.

Romanesque artists
People from Scania
12th-century sculptors
12th-century Danish people

fr:Tove (sculpteur)
sv:Tove stenmästare